Tags are one of the primary forms of graffiti, along with throw-ups and pieces. The act of writing a tag is known as tagging. 

Tags were the first form of modern graffiti, originating in New York City in the 1960s and 70s with artists such as TAKI 183 and Julio 204. and are often thought of as the simplest form of graffiti art, prioritising legibility and flow and are usually the form of graffiti that most artists start off with. Tags are, perhaps due to their simplicity, more likely to be considered vandalism than other more elaborate graffiti styles.

Form 
Often done in spray paint or markers, tags are established from throw-up and pieces by being 2D, often smaller in size, and thinner lines which are the result of speed necessity due to the often illegal nature of tagging. This necessity of speed has led to tags which are written in a single stroke called one-liners.

While throw-ups and pieces may be formed from any word or even sentence, a tag functions similarly to a signature, as they are the graffiti artist's pseudonym (although rarely a personal name may be used) written in the unique style of the individual artist so that two artists with the same name would be distinguishable from one another, although an artist using a name of an existing artist in their locale or a "king", or "j@mes" (well-respected artists) is a faux pas. Tags are often used by artists to sign larger pieces or street art. An individual's unique style is called a handstyle.

Function 

The purpose of tags is for an artist to have their tags recognised by other artists in their locale. The most prevalent taggers in an area are known as "all city", a term which originated in traditional New York graffiti.

While tags are often written onto objects directly, they are also sometimes written onto stickers (known as "slaps") and stuck onto things, which is faster and safer when illegally tagging. Postal and "my name is..." stickers are commonly used for this purpose.

See also

References 

Graffiti and unauthorised signage
Street art
Public art